68 East Main Street is a historic home in Yarmouth, Maine, United States. It was built in 1785, when the town was part of North Yarmouth (then a part of the Province of Massachusetts Bay), around seventy years after the "third, and earliest permanent, settlement" of the town.

Standing on East Main Street, at the corner of Yankee Drive, the property became the home of deacon Calvin Stockbridge, brother of merchant William Stockbridge, who lived across East Main Street.

The building had doubled in size by 1790. It has also served as a tavern, a general store and, between 1900 and 1907, a college preparatory and home school for girls, known as Stockbridge Hall and run by Alice and Minerva Dufour.

The home stood across Yankee Drive from "Herbie", which was planted in 1793, eight years after the home was completed, and was felled 217 years later in 2010. It was, between 1997 and 2010, the oldest and largest American elm in New England.

See also 

 Historical buildings and structures of Yarmouth, Maine

References 

Residential buildings in Yarmouth, Maine
Houses completed in 1785